Albert Leslie "Mick" Price (30 April 1914 – 19 November 1973) was an Australian rules footballer who played with Carlton in the Victorian Football League (VFL).

Price playing as both a forward and rover during his career and won the 1940 Gardiner Medal for best player in the reserves. He was a premiership player in 1938 and 1945, the latter the infamous Bloodbath Grand Final where Price contributed three goals.

References

External links

Blueseum profile

1914 births
Australian rules footballers from Melbourne
Carlton Football Club players
Carlton Football Club Premiership players
1973 deaths
Two-time VFL/AFL Premiership players
People from Carlton, Victoria